Aurivela longicauda, the longtail whiptail, is a species of teiid lizard endemic to Argentina.

References

longicauda
Reptiles described in 1843
Taxa named by Thomas Bell (zoologist)
Reptiles of Argentina